Liracraea titirangiensis is an extinct species of sea snail, a marine gastropod mollusk in the family Mangeliidae.

Description
The length of the shell attains 4.2 mm, its diameter 2 mm.

Distribution
This extinct species is endemic to New Zealand and fossils were found off the Chatham Islands

References

 J. Marwick. 1928. The Tertiary Mollusca of the Chatham Islands including a generic revision of the New Zealand Petinidae. Transactions of the New Zealand Institute 58:432–506
 Maxwell, P.A. (2009). Cenozoic Mollusca. pp 232–254 in Gordon, D.P. (ed.) New Zealand inventory of biodiversity. Volume one. Kingdom Animalia: Radiata, Lophotrochozoa, Deuterostomia. Canterbury University Press, Christchurch.

titirangiensis
Gastropods described in 1928
Gastropods of New Zealand